Géza Kardos (20 June 1918 – 13 July 1986) was a Hungarian basketball player. He competed in the men's tournament at the 1948 Summer Olympics.

References

1918 births
1986 deaths
Hungarian men's basketball players
Olympic basketball players of Hungary
Basketball players at the 1948 Summer Olympics
Basketball players from Budapest